"Cold Beer with Your Name on It" is a song recorded by American country music artist Josh Thompson. It was released on August 12, 2013. It is the first single from his second studio album Turn It Up. The song was written by Brent Anderson and Clint Daniels.

Critical reception
Billy Dukes of Taste of Country gave the song three and a half stars out of five, calling it "vivid, but familiar." Dukes wrote that it "isn’t as unique as some songs on the radio or from his catalog" but felt that it "stays true to his brand while opening the door for a few more to join the party."

Music video
The music video was directed by Chris Hicky and premiered in March 2014.

Chart performance
"Cold Beer with Your Name on It" debuted at number 52 on the U.S. Billboard Country Airplay chart for the week of August 31, 2013, and at number 50 on the U.S. Billboard Hot Country Songs chart for the week of August 10, 2013. It also debuted at number 88 on the Canadian Hot 100 chart for the week of August 10, 2013, becoming his first chart entry there.

Year-end charts

References

2013 songs
2013 singles
Josh Thompson (singer) songs
Show Dog-Universal Music singles
Songs written by Clint Daniels
Song recordings produced by Mark Wright (record producer)
Songs written by Brent Anderson (singer)
Music videos directed by Chris Hicky